Pistoia  is an Italian surname. Notable people with the surname include:

 Maëlle Pistoia (born 2001), French singer
 Nicola Pistoia (born 1954), Italian actor, director, and playwright

See also
 Pistoia (disambiguation)

Italian-language surnames